John Cotton (2 March 1930 – 1 October 2015) is an English footballer who played in the Football League for Stoke City and Crewe Alexandra.

Career
Cotton came through the youth ranks at his local club Stoke City and made two Second Division appearances for the "Potters" during the 1953–54 season. He never established himself in the first team at the Victoria Ground however, and left for Crewe Alexandra. He played 14 Third Division North and two FA Cup games for the "Railwaymen" during the 1954–55 campaign. He left Gresty Road for Port Vale, but never made a first team appearance for the "Valiants".

Career statistics
Source:

References

1930 births
2015 deaths
Footballers from Stoke-on-Trent
English footballers
Association football fullbacks
Stoke City F.C. players
Crewe Alexandra F.C. players
Port Vale F.C. players
English Football League players